John "Johnny" Egan (born John Francis Egan: 26 September 1939 – 14 December 2015) was an Irish Gaelic footballer who played as a left corner-back for the Offaly senior football team.

Born in Doon, County Offaly, Egan first arrived on the inter-county scene when he first linked up with the Offaly minor team. Named on the Offaly Football Team of the Century and regarded as one of his county's finest ever footballers, he made his senior debut during the 1957–58 league. Egan went on to play a key role for over a decade and had 99 League and Championship appearances and won two Leinster medals on the field of play. He was an All-Ireland runner-up on two occasions in 1961 and 1969. He played in front of a record crowd of 90,556 against Down in 1961. He captained the team in 1969.

At club level Egan began his career with Doon before later playing with Ballycumber and, after moving to Dublin for work, Kickhams in Dublin.

Throughout Egan's inter-county career, of his 99 appearances, 35 were championship appearances for Offaly. His retirement came during the conclusion of the 1970-71 league and Egan's last game for Offaly was in November 1970 when he lined out in his customary corner back position against Longford in the National Football League.

References

1939 births
2015 deaths
Doon Gaelic footballers
Ballymun Kickhams Gaelic footballers
Offaly inter-county Gaelic footballers